Juan de Ugalde (December 9, 1729 – 1816), later referred to erroneously as Juan de Uvalde by American settlers, was the Governor of Coahuila, now in Mexico. He was also a commanding general of Texas, Coahuila, Nuevo León, and Nuevo Santander. He led several military campaigns against Apache tribes in Texas.

Ugalde was born in Cádiz, Spain.   In 1787, he was promoted to commanding general of Texas, Coahuila, Nuevo León, and Nuevo Santander. In 1790, he successfully led Spanish soldiers against Apache forces at Arroyo de la Soledad, which was renamed in his honor as Cañon de Ugalde. In the mid-19th century, American settlers altered it to Uvalde, which is now the name of the city there. After the Spanish government ordered him back to Spain, Ugalde continued in the service and was promoted to field marshal in 1797. In 1810, he was promoted to lieutenant general. Ugalde died in Cádiz in 1816.

References

1729 births
1816 deaths
Spanish generals
People of Spanish Texas
Mexican people of Basque descent
Governors of Coahuila